Tuscumbia is the name of these places and things in the United States of America:
Tuscumbia, Alabama
Tuscumbia, Missouri
Tuscumbia River (in Tennessee and Mississippi)
, ships in the US Navy